Jerry Sumners Sr. Aurora Municipal Airport  is a city-owned public-use airport located two nautical miles (2.3 mi, 3.7 km) southeast of the central business district of Aurora, a city in Lawrence County, Missouri, United States. It is included in the FAA's National Plan of Integrated Airport Systems for 2011–2015, which categorized it as a general aviation facility.

Facilities and aircraft 
It has one runway designated 18/36 with an asphalt surface measuring 3,002 by 60 feet (915 x 18 m).

For the 12-month period ending May 31, 2008, the airport had 8,900 aircraft operations, an average of 24 per day: 98% general aviation, 1% air taxi, and 1% military. At that time there were 31 aircraft based at this airport: 93.5% single-engine and 6.5% multi-engine.

References

External links 
 Aurora Aviation, the fixed-base operator
  at Missouri DOT Airport Directory
 Aerial photo as of 3 March 1997 from USGS The National Map
 
 

Airports in Missouri
Buildings and structures in Lawrence County, Missouri